Siegfried Tiefensee (20 October 1922 – 24 March 2009) was a German musician and conductor.

Siegfried Tiefensee was born in Rastenburg, East Prussia, he started his artistic education in his early youth and learned piano, violin and composing. In 1947 he passed his exam as a music teacher and in 1951 his state examination as a conductor.

Tiefensee became the Kapellmeister at the theaters of Stendal (1951–1954), Gera (1954–1958) and Leipzig (1958-1990). In Leipzig he became the head of the section "drama music" at the "Theater der Jungen Welt" and composed several musical works for stages, TV and filmmusic. His works, such as the children's opera Cipollino, were published by the Friedrich Hofmeister Musikverlag.

Tiefensee was the father of four children, one of them the German politician Wolfgang Tiefensee. Tiefensee died in Leipzig.

Works 

 Cipollino, Ein Spiel für Kinder/Kinderoper, 1959
 Katz und Kätzchen, Oper für Kinder, 1960
 Schneewittchen, DEFA-Film, 1961
 Das Pinguinei, Musical für Kinder, 1962
 Adrian und das rote Auto, Kinderoper, 1966
 Mascha und der Bär, Kinderballett, 1968
 Die Zauberer sind da, Märchenstück mit Musik, 1968
 Rotkäppchen, Märchenstück mit Musik, 1968
 Das Rübchen, Märchenstück mit Musik, 1971
 Der neue Struwwelpeter, Musikalisches Bilderbuch /Kinderoper, 1972
 Vom Äffchen, das eine Brille trug, 1973
 Die Geschichte vom tapferen Schneiderlein, Kinderballett, 1978
 Die Bremer Stadtmusikanten, Märchenstück mit Musik, 1980
 Maus und Kater im Theater, Ein Spiel für zwei Darsteller mit viel Musik, 1984

Literature 

 Siegfried Tiefensee in: „Oper heute“, Almanach Nr. 1, Henschelverlag 1978
 Eberhard Rebling: Ballett A – Z, Henschelverlag 1980
 Brigitte Regler-Bellinger: Internationales Musiktheater für Kinder und Jugendliche, Frankfurt a. M. 1990 (pp 427 – 436)
 Die Musik in Geschichte und Gegenwart (MGG), ed. Ludwig Finscher, Sachteil Band 5, 1996, 2. neubearb. Ausgabe, Stichwort „Kinder- und Jugendmusiktheater“ (Brigitte Regler-Bellinger), p. 48, 49

References

External links 

1922 births
2009 deaths
People from Kętrzyn
People from East Prussia
German composers
German male conductors (music)
20th-century German conductors (music)
20th-century German male musicians